Neopseustidae is a small family of day and night-flying "archaic bell moths" in the order Lepidoptera. They are classified into their own superfamily Neopseustoidea and infraorder Neopseustina. Four genera are known. These primitive moths are restricted to South America and Southeast Asia. Their biology is unknown (Davis 1975; Davis and Nielsen 1980, 1984; Kristensen, 1999).

Nematocentropus appears to be the most primitive genus occurring in Assam, Myanmar and Sichuan, China. Three species of Neopseustis are distributed from Assam to Taiwan, whilst Synempora andesae and three species of Apoplania occur in southern South America (Kristensen, 1999: 53-54). The morphology of the antennae (Faucheux 2005ab; Faucheux et al., 2006) and the proboscis (Kristensen and Nielsen 1981) has been studied in detail.

References
Davis, D. R. (1975). Systematics and zoogeography of the family Neopseustidae with the proposal of a new superfamily (Lepidoptera: Neopseustoidea). Smithsonian Contributions to Zoology, 210: 1-45.
Davis, D. R. and Nielsen, E .S. (1980). Description of a new genus and two new species of Neopseustidae from South America, with discussion of phylogeny and biological observations (Lepidoptera: Neopseustoidea). Steenstrupia, 6(16): 253-289.
Davis, D. R. and Nielsen, E.S. (1984). The South American neopseustid genus Apoplania Davis: a new species, distribution records and notes on adult behaviour (Lepidoptera: Neopseustina). Entomologica Scandinavica, 15(4): 497-509.
Faucheux, M.J. (2005a). Les sensilles basiconiques gaufrées à base double ou triple de l’antenne du papillon sud-américain, Apoplania valdiviana Davis et Nielsen 1984 (Lepidoptera: Neopseustidae): distribution et importance numerique. Bulletin de la Société des Sciences Naturelles de l’Ouest de la France, 27(1).
Faucheux, M.J., (2005b). Note brève: Evolution d’un type de sensillaire antennaire dans la famille des Neopseustidae (Lepidoptera: Glossata), la sensille basiconique large et enflée. Bulletin de la Société des Sciences Naturelles de l’Ouest de la France, 27(1).
Faucheux, M.J., Kristensen, N.P. & Yen, S.-H. (2006) The antennae of neopseustid moths: morphology and phylogenetic implications, with special reference to the sensilla (Insecta, Lepidoptera, Neopseustidae). Zoologischer Anzeiger: 245: 131-142.
Kristensen, N.P., Nielsen E.S. (1981). Double-tube proboscis configuration in Neopseustid moths (Lepidoptera: Neopseustidae). International Journal of Insect Morphology and Embryology: 10: 483-486.
Kristensen, N.P. (1999). The homoneurous Glossata. Ch. 5, pp. 51–64 in Kristensen, N.P. (Ed.). Lepidoptera, Moths and Butterflies. Volume 1: Evolution, Systematics, and Biogeography. Handbuch der Zoologie. Eine Naturgeschichte der Stämme des Tierreiches / Handbook of Zoology. A Natural History of the phyla of the Animal Kingdom. Band / Volume IV Arthropoda: Insecta Teilband / Part 35: 491 pp. Walter de Gruyter, Berlin, New York.

Sources
Firefly Encyclopedia of Insects and Spiders, edited by Christopher O'Toole, 2002

External links
Tree of Life
Abstract
Apoplania penai Davis and Nielsen, 1984

 
Moth families